Renaat Julien Landuyt (born 28 January 1959) is a Belgian socialist politician. He is a member of the SP.A.

Renaat Landuyt became a licentiate in law in 1982 and has been an attorney since then. He was first elected to the Belgian House of Representatives in 1991, where he served until 1999. From 1995 to 1999 he served as a quaestor of the House. He served as secretary of the parliamentary investigation into the Dutroux Affair.

After the 1999 general elections Landuyt became Flemish minister of Labour and Tourism. After Steve Stevaert resigned from the Flemish government in 2003, Landuyt took over his portfolio of Deputy Minister-President on top of his own Minister of Labour and Tourism for the remainder of the term. After the regional elections of 2004, Landuyt left the Flemish government to become Minister of Transport in the federal government (2004–2007). He was elected again to the Belgian Parliament in June 2007 and after the establishment of the Leterme I Government took up his seat, in 2010 he was re-elected.

He was mayor of Bruges from 2013 to 2019.

External links
Official website of the Minister of Transport Landuyt only in Dutch or French.

|-

1959 births
Living people
Mayors of Bruges
Members of the Belgian Federal Parliament
Ministers-President of Flanders
Politicians from Ypres
Socialistische Partij Anders politicians
21st-century Belgian politicians